The Hamburg School District is a comprehensive community public school district that serves students in pre-kindergarten through eighth grade from Hamburg, in Sussex County, New Jersey, United States.

As of the 2018–19 school year, the district, comprised of one school, had an enrollment of 243 students and 29.3 classroom teachers (on an FTE basis), for a student–teacher ratio of 8.3:1.

The district is classified by the New Jersey Department of Education as being in District Factor Group "DE", the fifth-highest of eight groupings. District Factor Groups organize districts statewide to allow comparison by common socioeconomic characteristics of the local districts. From lowest socioeconomic status to highest, the categories are A, B, CD, DE, FG, GH, I and J.

For ninth through twelfth grades, public school students attend Wallkill Valley Regional High School which also serves students from Franklin, Hardyston Township and Ogdensburg Borough as part of the Wallkill Valley Regional High School District. As of the 2018–19 school year, the high school had an enrollment of 604 students and 56.0 classroom teachers (on an FTE basis), for a student–teacher ratio of 10.8:1.

Schools
Schools in the district (with 2018–19 enrollment data from the National Center for Education Statistics) are:
Elementary school
Hamburg School, with 244 students in grades PreK-8
RJ Baumgartner, Vice Principal

Administration
Core members of the district's administration are:
Kimberly Sigman, Superintendent
William Sabo, Interim Business Administrator / Board Secretary

Board of education
The district's board of education, comprised of seven members, sets policy and oversees the fiscal and educational operation of the district through its administration. As a Type II school district, the board's trustees are elected directly by voters to serve three-year terms of office on a staggered basis, with two or three seats up for election each year held (since 2012) as part of the November general election. The board appoints a superintendent to oversee the day-to-day operation of the district.

References

External links
 Hamburg School District
 
 School Data for the Hamburg School District, National Center for Education Statistics

Hamburg, New Jersey
New Jersey District Factor Group DE
School districts in Sussex County, New Jersey
Public K–8 schools in New Jersey